The Battle of Kiev in January 1919 was one of the three battles in Kiev (Kyiv), capital of Ukraine during the Russian Civil War and Ukrainian–Soviet War. It involved an offensive by elements of the Ukrainian Front of the Red Army to capture Kiev.

This battle was a part of the General Offensive of the Ukrainian Front in Ukraine.

On January 22, Nizhyn was occupied.
On January 24, the Red Army approached Brovary and occupied the city after fierce fighting.
On February 5, after three days of fighting, the Red Army entered Kiev.

References 

Conflicts in 1919
1919 in Ukraine
Battles of the Ukrainian–Soviet War
Ukrainian People's Republic
January 1919 events
February 1919 events
1910s in Kyiv